This is a partial list of Buddhist monasteries in the Indian state of Sikkim.

Notes
Dates in list above are from National Informatics Center unless footnoted.

References

Sikkim
Buddhist monasteries
Buddhist monasteries